5 min was a free newspaper published in Latvia.

References

2005 establishments in Latvia
Latvian-language newspapers
Defunct newspapers published in Latvia
Russian-language newspapers published in Latvia
Newspapers established in 2005
2010 disestablishments in Latvia
Publications disestablished in 2010
Defunct free daily newspapers